The Peipsi whitefish (Coregonus maraenoides) is a freshwater whitefish of the family Salmonidae that naturally occurs in Lake Peipus on the border of Estonia and Russia, from where it also ascends to Lake Võrtsjärv to spawn. It has been introduced in Lake Burtnieks (Latvia), Gulf of Riga (Baltic Sea), many lakes of northern Russia, Poland, Germany, Netherlands, Japan, Lake Sevan (Armenia) and Balkash (Kazakhstan). It is a benthopelagic fish up to 60 cm long.

It is part of the European whitefish complex  (Coregonus lavaretus sensu lato), and often not distinguished from C. lavaretus.

References 

Coregonus
Taxa named by Lev Berg
Fish described in 1916
Freshwater fish of Europe